Berbérati is the second-largest city in the Central African Republic, with a population of 105,155(2013 census). Located in the south-west of the country near the border with Cameroon, it serves as capital of the Mambéré-Kadéï Prefecture and gives its name (as capital) to the main Sub-prefecture.

History 

The city was founded in 1893. In the early 20th century Berbérati was part of Oubangui-Chari, one of the four territories comprising French Equatorial Africa which later became Central African Republic. In 1911 it was ceded to the German Empire under the terms of the Morocco–Congo Treaty and the Treaty of Fez, becoming part of the German colony of Neukamerun, until it was reconquered by the French in 1916 following the defeat of German forces in western Africa during World War I.

Health 
The state-owned university hospital of Berbérati is an unfenced complex of several bungalows near the town center. The hospital was constructed in the 1950s and operated by French military doctors until the 1980s. The French hospital administrators were succeeded by an expatriate Italian Catholic nun, although the hospital also receives Protestant support.

Transports 
Berbérati is served by the Berbérati Airport.

Climate 
Köppen-Geiger climate classification system classifies Berbérati’s climate as tropical wet and dry (Aw).

Places of worship    
Among the places of worship, they are predominantly Christian 
churches and temples : Evangelical Lutheran Church of the Central African Republic (Lutheran World Federation), Evangelical Baptist Church of the Central African Republic (Baptist World Alliance), Roman Catholic Diocese of Berbérati (Catholic Church).  There are also Muslim mosques.

See also 
 Dzanga-Sangha Special Reserve
 List of cities in the Central African Republic
 Prefectures of the Central African Republic

References 

Sub-prefectures of the Central African Republic
Populated places in the Central African Republic
Populated places in Mambéré-Kadéï